Poorman 88 is an Indian reserve of the Kawacatoose First Nation in Saskatchewan. It is 87 kilometres northwest of Fort Qu'Appelle. In the 2016 Canadian Census, it recorded a population of 729 living in 172 of its 196 total private dwellings. In the same year, its Community Well-Being index was calculated at 47 of 100, compared to 58.4 for the average First Nations community and 77.5 for the average non-Indigenous community.

References

Indian reserves in Saskatchewan
Division No. 10, Saskatchewan
Kawacatoose First Nation